Vasile Nicoarǎ (13 June 1937 – 1978) was a Romanian sprint canoeist who competed in 1960s. He won five medals at the ICF Canoe Sprint World Championships with three golds (K-1 4 x 500 m, K-2 500 m, K-2 1000 m: all 1963), a silver (K-4 1000 m: 1963), and a bronze (K-1 4 x 500 m: 1966).

Nicoarǎ also competed in two Summer Olympics, earning his best finish of fourth in the K-2 1000 m event at Tokyo in 1964.

References

1937 births
1978 deaths
Canoeists at the 1960 Summer Olympics
Canoeists at the 1964 Summer Olympics
Olympic canoeists of Romania
Romanian male canoeists
ICF Canoe Sprint World Championships medalists in kayak